John L. Greene (November 10, 1912 – October 4, 1995) was an American screenwriter. He was the creator of the American science fiction sitcom My Favorite Martian.

Greene started his career in the 1930s writing for radio programs. He started writing for television in 1951 on the short film Tinhorn Troubadors. His television credits include  The Adventures of Ozzie and Harriet, Our Miss Brooks, Bewitched, Petticoat Junction, The Real McCoys, The Andy Griffith Show, Green Acres and I Dream of Jeannie. He retired in 1976, last writing credits being for 2 episodes of Chico and the Man.

Greene died in October 1995 of natural causes in Los Angeles, California, at the age of 82.

References

External links 

1912 births
1995 deaths
People from Buffalo, New York
American screenwriters
American television writers
American male television writers
American male screenwriters
20th-century American screenwriters